Ernst Heinrich Wilhelm von Stephan (born Heinrich Stephan, January 7, 1831 – April 8, 1897) was a general post director for the German Empire who reorganized the German postal service. He was integral in the founding of the Universal Postal Union in 1874, and in 1877 introduced the telephone to Germany.

Biography
Stephan was born in Stolp (Słupsk), Pomerania, in the Kingdom of Prussia. He began his career as a local postal clerk in the service of the Prussian post in 1849. In 1866 he was put in charge by the Prussian government of federalizing the postal service that had long been privately run by the noble Thurn und Taxis family. In 1870 he was named director of postal services for the North German Confederation. Stephan's career then moved quickly up the ranks, as he was named Postmaster General of the German Empire in 1876, the Undersecretary of State in charge of the post office in 1880, and the Minister of Postal Services for Germany in 1895.

When Stephan began his work as a postal worker, Germany was divided into 17 independent states, each with its own separate policies and fees. He worked early on to establish a uniform postage rate throughout Germany, to facilitate easier mailing. His general goal of standardization and internationalization is evident in his work to combine the postal service with the telegraph service in Germany, and in his efforts to organize the International Postal Conference in Bern in 1874, in which the Universal Postal Union was established. He introduced the postcard (which he had initially suggested in 1865) to Germany after Chancellor Otto von Bismarck promoted him in 1870: the postcard came into widespread use in the subsequent Franco-Prussian War of 1870-71 as a method of communication between units in the field.  He is also credited with having introduced the telephone to Germany.

Stephan died in 1897 in Berlin, having made a profound impact on the standardization of mail service worldwide. He was also actively engaged in cultivating purely Germanic terminology for the field of telecommunication and postal services. The German-speaking afterworld thus gained terms such as "Fernsprechapparat" (distance-speaking-device) for telephone, "Wertzeichen" (value-sign) for stamp, "postlagernd" (post-office-stored) for poste restante and "Anschrift" (towards-lettering, analogous to "Ansprache" or "Anrede" for addressing a person or a salutation) for address. The word creations mandated by von Stephan in the 1870s gained circulation at post offices and among its workforce, but many times the Greek or French original term was retained by German speakers. Thus at home people would say "frankieren" for putting stamps on a postcard or letter envelope (Briefumschlag) among themselves, but switch to "freimachen" (absolve from stamp-debt, thus permitting delivery) when at the post office. Or at home they would say "Telefon" in everyday speech, although the arcane official term was "Fernsprecher" (remote speaker) or Fernsprechapparat. His achievements in the field of postal services far outweigh this pedantic purism and it was his proposal to have the Siemens company manufacture telephones which led to the development of an entirely new business segment for the famous German company in 1878.

Works
Geschichte der Preussischen Post von ihrem Ursprunge bis auf die Gegenwart: nach amtl. Quellen. Berlin 1859. Reprint 1987, .

Notes

References
 Beyrer, Klaus and Behringer, Wolfgang (1997) Kommunikation im Kaiserreich: der Generalpostmeister Heinrich von Stephan (Communication in the German Empire: the Postmaster General Heinrich von Stephan) Museum für Post und Kommunikation, Braus, Heidelberg, in German
 Eckhardt, Carl Conrad (1941) Heinrich von Stephan, Founder of the Universal Postal Union University of Colorado, Boulder, Colorado,

External links

 
 

1831 births
1897 deaths
People from Słupsk
People of the German Empire
People from the Province of Pomerania
German postmasters
Universal Postal Union people
Members of the Prussian House of Lords
Postal pioneers
Burials at Dreifaltigkeitsfriedhof I, Berlin